Las 24 horas is a 1982 Argentine telenovela starring Amelia Bence, Héctor Biuchet and Alba Castellanos. It aired on Canal 13.

References

Argentine telenovelas
1982 telenovelas
El Trece telenovelas
Spanish-language telenovelas